Poole is a town in Dorset, England. 

This is home to, or gives its name to:
 The Lighthouse (Poole), an arts centre
 Lilliput, Poole, a district
 Poole Bay, a stretch of sea
 Poole Bridge
 Poole Grammar School, an all-boys school
 Poole Harbour, a large natural harbour 
 Poole High School, a mixed-gender school in England
 Poole Logboat, a 300 - 200 BC hollowed tree trunk boat
 Poole Museum
 Poole Park
 Poole Pirates, a motorcycle speedway team
 Poole Pottery, a pottery manufacturer founded in 1873
 Poole railway station
 Poole Stadium, a greyhound racing venue and speedway track in England
 Poole Town F.C., a football club in England
 Poole (UK Parliament constituency)

Poole may also refer to:

People

Entertainment
 Charlie Poole and the North Carolina Ramblers, a 1920s American string band
 Crane, Poole & Schmidt, a fictional Massachusetts law firm
 The Dowling Poole, an English power-pop band
 Henry Poole is Here, a 2008 film
 Poole - HAL 9000, a fictional chess game in the movie 2001: A Space Odyssey

Other places
 Poole, Cheshire, a civil parish in England
 Poole, Estonia, village in Elva Parish, Tartu County, Estonia
 Poole County, New South Wales, in Australia
 Poole's Cavern, a natural limestone cave in Derbyshire, England
 Poole, Kentucky, United States
 Poole, Nebraska, United States

Nature
 5342 Le Poole, an asteroid
 Eleutherodactylus poolei, a frog species

Other
 Henry Poole & Co, a London tailor's shop
 Poole Gakuin University, in Japan
 Poole's Corner Provincial Park, a provincial park in Canada
 Pooles Island Light, a lighthouse in Maryland, United States
 USS Poole (DE-151), a U.S. Navy, World War II destroyer escort ship
 Wayland E. Poole House, a historic home in North Carolina, United States
 Wendy Poole Park, a parkland in British Columbia, Canada

See also 
 Pool (disambiguation)